Carla Wong McMillian (born May 27, 1973) is an associate justice of the Supreme Court of Georgia and former judge of the Georgia Court of Appeals.

Education and legal career

McMillian attended Westminster Schools of Augusta, graduating the top of her class. McMillian received her bachelor's degrees in both history and economics from Duke University and her Juris Doctor from the University of Georgia School of Law. She later served as a law clerk to William Clark O'Kelley of the United States District Court for the Northern District of Georgia. She then went on to be a partner with Sutherland Asbill & Brennan LLP.

State court service 

On June 18, 2010 McMillian was one of three candidates recommended by the nominating commission for a vacancy on the Griffin Judicial Circuit. On August 11, 2010 Governor Sonny Perdue appointed McMillan to be a Judge of the Georgia State Court for Fayette County.

Appointment to Georgia Court of Appeals 

On January 16, 2013 Governor Nathan Deal appointed McMillian to the Georgia Court of Appeals to fill the vacancy created by the resignation of A. Harris Adams. She was sworn into office on January 24, 2013. She is the first Asian Pacific American state appellate judge ever to be appointed in the Southeast. Upon her election in 2014, Judge McMillian became the first Asian American to be elected to a statewide office in Georgia.

Appointment to Georgia Supreme Court 

In early March 2020, McMillian was submitted as a potential nominee to the governor, along with Judge Verda Colvin, Judge Sara L. Doyle and Judge Shawn LaGrua, all women. On March 27, 2020, Governor Brian Kemp announced his appointment of McMillian to the Supreme Court of Georgia. She fills the seat left vacant by Robert Benham who retired on March 1, 2020. At the time of her appointment, McMillian became the first Asian American woman in the Southeast to be appointed to the state's highest court.

Personal life

She is married to her husband, Lance, and has two children.

Memberships 

She currently serves or has served in leadership roles for the Georgia Asian Pacific American Bar Association, the Fayette County Historical Society, the Partnership Against Domestic Violence, the Real Life Center, the Atlanta Chapter of the Federalist Society for Law and Public Policy Studies, the Georgia Legal History Foundation.

See also
List of Asian American jurists

References

External links
Official Biography on Georgia Judicial Branch website

1973 births
Living people
20th-century American lawyers
21st-century American judges
American jurists of Asian descent
Duke University Trinity College of Arts and Sciences alumni
Federalist Society members
Georgia Court of Appeals judges
Georgia (U.S. state) Republicans
Georgia (U.S. state) state court judges
Georgia (U.S. state) lawyers
People from Tyrone, Georgia
Justices of the Supreme Court of Georgia (U.S. state)
University of Georgia School of Law alumni
20th-century American women lawyers
21st-century American women judges